Churcher is a surname. Notable people with the surname include:

Arthur Churcher (1871–1951), British Army officer
Betty Churcher (1931–2015), Australian arts administrator
Charles Churcher (1873–1951), British sport shooter
Christine Churcher (born 1954), Ghanaian politician
Harry Churcher (1910–1972), British racewalker
John Churcher (1905–1997), British Army officer
Peter Churcher (born 1964), Australian artist
Richard Churcher (1659–1723), English businessman and philanthropist
Teresa Churcher, English actress

See also
Church (disambiguation)